Punishment & Society is a peer-reviewed academic journal that covers the fields of criminology and penology. The journal's editors-in-chief are Kelly Hannah-Moffat (University of Toronto, Canada) and Mona Lynch (University of California, Irvine, USA). It was established in 1999 and is currently published by SAGE Publications.

Abstracting and indexing 
Punishment & Society is abstracted and indexed in Scopus and the Social Sciences Citation Index. According to the Journal Citation Reports, its 2016 impact factor is 2.040, ranking it 14 out of 58 journals in the category "Criminology and Penology".

References

External links 
 

SAGE Publishing academic journals
English-language journals
Criminology journals
Publications established in 1999
Works about punishment
5 times per year journals